Khedri (also Romanized as Khedrī and Khederī; also known as Hadri and Hedrī) is a village in Jowkar Rural District, Jowkar District, Malayer County, Hamadan Province, Iran. At the 2006 census, its population was 496, in 112 families.

References 

Populated places in Malayer County